Hanousek may refer to:

 Hanousek (surname)
 Hanousek v. United States, 1999 United States federal case